

Offseason
 December 10, 1985: George Vukovich was purchased from the Indians by the Seibu Lions (Japan Pacific).
 January 7, 1986: Roy Smith and Ramón Romero were traded by the Indians to the Minnesota Twins for Ken Schrom and Bryan Oelkers.
 January 14, 1986: Troy Neel was drafted by the Indians in the 9th round of the 1986 Major League Baseball draft. Player signed May 5, 1986.
 January 23, 1986: Fran Mullins was purchased by the Indians from the San Francisco Giants.
 February 8, 1986: Dickie Noles was signed as a free agent by the Indians.
 February 10, 1986: Butch Benton was released by the Indians.
 February 25, 1986: Jim Kern was signed as a free agent by the Indians.

Regular season

Season standings

Record vs. opponents

Notable transactions
 March 28, 1986: Dave Von Ohlen was released by the Indians.
 April 1, 1986: Jerry Willard was released by the Indians.
 June 2, 1986: Greg Swindell was drafted by the Indians in the 1st round (2nd pick) of the 1986 Major League Baseball draft. Player signed July 31, 1986.
 June 17, 1986: Jim Kern was released by the Indians.
 June 20, 1986: Neal Heaton was traded by the Indians to the Minnesota Twins for John Butcher.

Opening Day Lineup

Roster

Player stats

Batting
Note: G = Games played; AB = At bats; R = Runs scored; H = Hits; 2B = Doubles; 3B = Triples; HR = Home runs; RBI = Runs batted in; AVG = Batting average; SB = Stolen bases

Pitching
Note: W = Wins; L = Losses; ERA = Earned run average; G = Games pitched; GS = Games started; SV = Saves; IP = Innings pitched; R = Runs allowed; ER = Earned runs allowed; BB = Walks allowed; K = Strikeouts

Game log

|-  style="text-align:center; background:#bfb;"
| 1 || April 7 || @ Orioles || 6-4 || Schrom (1-0) || Flanagan (0-1) || Camacho (1) || 52,292 || 1-0
|-  style="text-align:center; background:#fbb;"
| 2 || April 9 || @ Orioles || 4-3 || Aase (1-0) || Bailes (0-1) || || 13,039 || 1-1
|-  style="text-align:center; background:#fbb;"
| 3 || April 10 || @ Orioles || 5-1 || Dixon (1-0) || Kern (0-1) || Bordi (1) || 12,933 || 1-2
|-  style="text-align:center; background:#fbb;"
| 4 || April 11 || Tigers || 7-2 || Terrell (1-0) || Niekro (0-1) || || 32,441 || 1-3
|-  style="text-align:center; background:#bfb;"
| 5 || April 12 || Tigers || 6-2 || Schrom (2-0) || Morris (1-1) || Camacho (2) || 17,426 || 2-3
|-  style="text-align:center; background:#bfb;"
| 6 || April 13 || Tigers || 8-2 || Bailes (1-1) || Tanana (0-1) || || 10,463 || 3-3
|-  style="text-align:center; background:#fbb;"
| 7 || April 15 || Yankees || 6-2 || Niekro (1-0) || Candiotti (0-1) || Fisher (1) || 3,223 || 3-4
|-  style="text-align:center; background:#bbb;"
| — || April 16 || Yankees || colspan=6| Postponed
|-  style="text-align:center; background:#bfb;"
| 8 || April 17 || Yankees || 6-4 || Niekro (1-1) || Tewksbury (1-1) || Bailes (1) || 5,602 || 4-4
|-  style="text-align:center; background:#fbb;"
| 9 || April 18 || @ Tigers || 6-1 || Tanana (1-1) || Schrom (2-1) || || 20,703 || 4-5
|-  style="text-align:center; background:#bfb;"
| 10 || April 19 || @ Tigers || 8-6 || Bailes (2-1) || Petry (1-2) || Camacho (3) || 19,216 || 5-5
|-  style="text-align:center; background:#bbb;"
| — || April 20 || @ Tigers || colspan=6| Postponed
|-  style="text-align:center; background:#bfb;"
| 11 || April 21 || Orioles || 7-0 || Candiotti (1-1) || Flanagan (1-2) || || 3,012 || 6-5
|-  style="text-align:center; background:#fbb;"
| 12 || April 22 || Orioles || 5-2 || Dixon (2-0) || Niekro (1-2) || Aase (4) || 3,004 || 6-6
|-  style="text-align:center; background:#bfb;"
| 13 || April 23 || Orioles || 5-1 || Schrom (3-1) || McGregor (1-2) || Bailes (2) || 3,788 || 7-6
|-  style="text-align:center; background:#fbb;"
| 14 || April 24 || @ Yankees || 2-1 || Guidry (3-0) || Heaton (0-1) || || 17,299 || 7-7
|-

Awards and honors

All-Star Game

Farm system 

LEAGUE CHAMPIONS: Waterloo

Notes

References
1986 Cleveland Indians team at Baseball-Reference
1986 Cleveland Indians team page at www.baseball-almanac.com

Cleveland Guardians seasons
Cleveland Indians season
Cleveland Indians